Charles Joseph Patissier, Marquis de Bussy-Castelnau (8 February 1718 or 8 February 1720 – 7 January 1785) or Charles Joseph Patissier de Bussy was the Governor General of the French colony of Pondicherry from 1783 to 1785. He served with distinction under Joseph François Dupleix in the East Indies, receiving the Order of Saint Louis. He contributed to the recovery from Britain of Pondicherry in 1748, and was named in 1782 to lead all French military forces beyond the Cape of Good Hope. He coordinated his operations with Pierre André de Suffren and fought against the British during the Indian campaigns of the American War of Independence.

Early life and military career
Charles Joseph Patissier de Bussy was born as the son of N. Patissier de Bussy, colonel of infantry, and Sophie Ernestine Passaval. He was born either on 8 February 1718 in Bucy-le-Long, or on 8 February 1720 in Ancienville. He had a younger brother named Bouchard Patissier de Bussy, a lieutenant-colonel who died at 32 in July 1757. He also had a sister named Madeleine Sophie Patissier de Bussy.

De Bussy was appointed lieutenant in 1733 and captain in 1734. After the death of his father in 1736, he took up service in the French East India Company. He landed the same year in Port-Louis on Isle de France (Mauritius), whose governor general was Bertrand-François Mahé de La Bourdonnais. There, he participated in the military protection of the island. In 1738 he was on Île Bourbon (Réunion).

Yanam
The Yanam region was presented to the Marquis de Bussy, the French General by Vizianagaram King Pusapati Peda Vijaya Rama Raju (1670–1756) as a token of gratitude for the help rendered by him in the fight against the rulers of Bobbili. Actually, it was in 1750 when French leader de Bussy was staying with entire battalion near Hyderabad. Many soldiers have died due to some disease (smallpox). He was running with financial crisis. Vijayaramaraju of Vizianagaram helped him to overcome financial crisis and rebuild his battalion.

Carnatic Wars
On 23 November 1753, a Paravana of Asif ad-Dawlah Mir Ali Salabat Jang, Subedar of Deccan conceded to  Marquis de Bussy-Castelnau the paraganas of Chicacole, Ellore, Rajahmundry etc. with an annual revenue RS.2, 00,000 for the maintenance of the French troops in the Subah in recognition of the help of these Circars amounted up to 10 lakhs of Rupees per year. de Bussy helped Salabat Jang to be the Subedar of Deccan. The agreement (Treaty of Aurangabad) made between the French and Salabat Jang in Aurangabad bears the signature of rukn o dowla syed Lashkar khan lashkar jung, Prime Minister of Salabat Jang. Actually, He was one of the key sub-ordinates of Dupleix who helped him in expanding French activities in Northern Circars and along the Coromandel Coast. Men in his command also included the famous Hyder Ali of Mysore.

In 1756 Marquis de Bussy visited Rajahmundry. Vijayaramaraju had given a warm welcome to Bussy by going in front at Rajahmundry. There were differences between Vizianagaram Maharaja and the ruler of Bobbili, which led to the battle of Bobbili starting on 23 January 1757. The war was fought between the Rajah of Vizianagaram, Vijayaramaraju aided by the Bussy, the then French General  and the Rajah of Bobbili. During the battle the Bobbili fort was totally destroyed and many Bobbili soldiers died. There is still a street named after Bussy in Yanam.

Relations with the Mughal Emperor Alamgir II
In the year 1755, De Bussy received letter from the newly ordained Mughal Emperor Alamgir II requesting French assistance to put down the Maratha Confederacy. Alamgir II asked if it was possible for De Bussy to dispatch a French contingent of 1000 strong. Alamgir II also promised to pay a hefty sum for the maintenance of the French and even promised to settle disputes in the Carnatic Wars in favor of the French East India Company.

Death
De Bussy died in Pondicherry on 7 January 1785.

Family
He was married to the youngest stepdaughter of Dupleix, Marie in March 1754. He begot a daughter from her who died at Paris in 1759.

See also
 Carnatic Wars
 Hyder Ali
 Inde française
 Madame Dupleix
 Muzaffar Jung

Notes

References
d'Hozier, Jean François Louis.  L'impot du sang: ou, La noblesse de France sur les champs de bataille, Volume 3
 Malleson, George.  History of the French in India: from the founding of Pondichery in 1674 to the capture of that place in 1761

French colonial governors and administrators
Governors of French India
French generals
Order of Saint Louis recipients
History of Puducherry
French military personnel of the American Revolutionary War
French military personnel of the War of the Austrian Succession
French military personnel of the Seven Years' War
Yanam
1785 deaths
1718 births
People from Aisne